The City of Karratha is one of the four local government areas in the Pilbara region of Western Australia. It was formerly known as the Shire of Roebourne but was renamed and granted city status on 1 July 2014.

History

The City of Karratha originated as the Roebourne Road District, which was established on 6 January 1887. The towns of Roebourne and Cossack were both excised as their own municipalities on 1 December 1887, forming the Municipality of Roebourne and Municipality of Cossack. As the region's population declined, both the Roebourne and Cossack municipalities merged back into the road district in 1910, Roebourne on 11 March and then Cossack on 13 August.

On 1 July 1961, it became the Shire of Roebourne under the Local Government Act 1960. On 1 July 2014 it was granted city status and renamed the City of Karratha.

Wards
The city is divided into wards:

Karratha (six councillors)
Dampier (two councillors)
Roebourne/Pastoral (one councillor)

Towns, suburbs and localities
The towns, suburbs and localities of the City of Karratha with population and size figures based on the most recent Australian census:

Heritage-listed places

As of 2023, 122 places are heritage-listed in the City of Karratha, of which 30 are on the State Register of Heritage Places. Of those, 18 are located in Cossack and ten are in Roebourne; with the only two outside those two locations being the Cooya Pooya Station and the De Grey - Mullewa Stock Route.

References

External links

 

 
Karratha
Cities in Western Australia